The Qawwal Bacchon Ka Gharana or Delhi Gharana is the oldest khayal gharana of the Hindustani Classical music tradition. It was founded by Amir Khusrau and his students.

History
The members of this gharana have lived in Delhi for many generations. The gharana was founded by Amir Khusrau, pioneer of qawwali, tarana, and khayal. As a result, this gharana specializes in these genres.

Style
Members of this gharana approach raagdari with more freedom than the dhrupad-informed gharanas, like Gwalior, Jaipur, and Agra. Emphasis on bhav and exposition are the hallmarks of this style.

Repertoire
In addition to extensive khayal compositions, the gharana is known for its qawwals.

Controversy
Some orthodox members of the Indian subcontinental or South Asian music world don't regard the Delhi gharana as an "authentic" one because its members include a number of tabla and sarangi players. Some believe these members do not represent a truly unique musical style. Scholars note the individual quality of each generation's leading singer. Though, this tradition is a gharana in familial terms.

It is strictly forbidden to play Sarangi in the tradition of the original Qawwal Bacche.

Exponents
 Amir Khusrau
 Miyan Saamat Bin Ibrahim
 Mir Hassan Sawant
 Mir Bula Kalawant
 Mir Saleh 
 Mir Gunwant
 Bade Muhammad Khan
 Bade Mubarak Ali Khan
 Ghagge Nazir Khan
 Wahid Khan
 Umrao Khan
 Munshi Raziuddin
  Manzoor Ahmed Khan Niazi  
 Fareed Ayaz
 Abdullah Niazi Qawwal
 Abu Muhammad
  Bahauddin Khan 
 Baba Nasir Khan
 Miyan Achpal
 Tanras Khan
 Ramzan Khan
 Muhammed Siddiq Khan Sahab
 Muzaffar Khan
 Munawwar Khan
 Aziz Ahmed Khan Warsi
 Warsi Brothers
 Meraj Ahmed Nizami Qawwal
 Mohammed Hayat Khan Nizami
 Baba Zaheer Ahmed Khan Warsi
 Nasir Ahmed Khan
  Fateh Ali Khan
 Nusrat Fateh Ali Khan
 Iqbal Ahmed Khan
 Farrukh Fateh Ali Khan
 Rahat Fateh Ali Khan

Pedagogical Genealogy

References 

Vocal gharanas
Delhi
Culture of Delhi